Salvador Honrubia (born 1 January 1937) is a Spanish racing cyclist. He rode in the 1964 Tour de France.

References

External links
 

1937 births
Living people
Spanish male cyclists
Place of birth missing (living people)
Cyclists from the Valencian Community
Sportspeople from Castellón de la Plana